Neocoenyra paralellopupillata is a butterfly in the family Nymphalidae. It is found in north-eastern Tanzania and possibly Malawi. The habitat consists of montane forests at altitudes of about 2,200 meters.

References

Satyrini
Butterflies described in 1897
Butterflies of Africa
Taxa named by Ferdinand Karsch